San Juan Cieneguilla is a town and municipality in Oaxaca in south-western Mexico. It is part of the Silacayoapam District in the Mixteca Region.
The municipality covers an area of 167.13 km².

As of 2005, the municipality had a total population of 556.

References

Municipalities of Oaxaca